Sergei Vladimirovich Volosyan (born 6 April 1989) is a Russian former professional football player.

Club career
He made his Russian Football National League debut for FC KAMAZ Naberezhnye Chelny on 20 July 2015 in a game against FC Volgar Astrakhan.

External links
 

1989 births
Living people
Russian footballers
Association football defenders
FC Lada-Tolyatti players
FC Tyumen players
FC KAMAZ Naberezhnye Chelny players
FC Sakhalin Yuzhno-Sakhalinsk players
FC Zenit-Izhevsk players
FC Torpedo Vladimir players
Sportspeople from Tolyatti